Rangpur City Corporation ( - in short: RCC) established in 28 June 2012, is one of the city corporations of Bangladesh. Current mayor of RpCC is Mostafizar Rahman Mostafa who was Nominated by Jatiya Party. Rangpur City Corporation is a formation under the local government administration of Bangladesh to regulate the city area of Rangpur, which is under the Ministry of Local Government & Rural Development (LGRD). Generally under local government, an election is held to elect a mayor of Rangpur City Corporation. Rangpur City Corporation's total area is 205.76 square kilometers with approximately has the population of 7,96,556 people in the city corporation area. The first elected mayor of the Rangpur City Corporation during 2012–2017 is Sharfuddin Ahmed Jhantu.

Services 
The Rangpur City Corporation is responsible for administering and providing basic infrastructure to the city.
 Evict illegal installations.
 Purify and supply water.
 Treat and dispose of contaminated water and sewage.
 Eliminate waterlogging.
 Garbage removal and street cleaning.
 To manage solid waste.
 To arrange hospital and dispensary.
 Construction and maintenance of roads.
 Installation of electric street lights.
 Establish car parking.
 Maintenance parks and playground.
 Maintenance of cemeteries and crematoriums.
 Preparation of birth and death registration certificate.
 Preserving the traditional place.
 Disease control, immunization.
 Establishment of city corporation schools and colleges.

List of officeholders

Election

Election Result 2022

References

 
City Corporations of Bangladesh
Rangpur District